Bear Creek National Scenic Area is a federally designated National Scenic Area in Smyth County, Virginia, USA. The  scenic area is administered by the U.S. Forest Service as part of Jefferson National Forest. Mountains and ridges within the scenic area include Walker Mountain to the north and Brushy Mountain to the south, with the headwaters of Bear Creek in the valley between the ridges. Four miles of the Appalachian Trail run through the scenic area.

The National Scenic Area was established by Public Law 111-11, the Omnibus Public Land Management Act of 2009.

See also
Natural Atlas
Crawfish Valley (Bear Creek)

References

External links
 George Washington and Jefferson National Forest
 Appalachian Trail

George Washington and Jefferson National Forests
National scenic areas
Protected areas of Virginia
Protected areas established in 2009